Pixley ka Seme Municipality may refer to:
 Pixley ka Seme District Municipality in Northern Cape province, South Africa
 Pixley ka Seme Local Municipality in Mpumalanga province, South Africa